"Rockin' for Myself" is a song by British electronic dance music record producer Motiv8, aka Steve Rodway. Based around a vocal loop originally performed by Anne-Marie Smith on Italian dance act 49ers' 1992 single, "Move Your Feet", it was released in late 1993 and features vocals by British singer Angie Brown. This version reached number 67 on the UK Singles Chart. In the spring of 1994, it was re-mixed and re-released, peaking at number 18 in the UK. But on the UK Dance Singles Chart, it was even more successful, peaking at number-one. On the Eurochart Hot 100, it reached number 63. Outside Europe, it was successful in Australia, peaking at number nine. A music video was made, featuring a model and dancer lip-syncing the song on a red sofa, wearing yellow sweater and beret.

Background and release
Before going under the name Motiv 8, Steve Rodway released mostly underground tracks under different names in the early 90's. One of these was an early version of "Rockin' for Myself". He thought it sounded much more commercial than the other and when the demand for underground techno began to fall off, he recorded a new version of the track, which would become a massive hit in clubs. Warner Records signed him and a new remix was released, reaching the Top 20 in the UK. From then, Rodway stuck with the name Motiv 8. He told in an interview, that because of the song's success, Jarvis Cocker of Pulp approaced him, asking for a remix of "Common People". The following success of that remix played a big part in establishing the name Motiv 8, according to Rodway.

Critical reception
Larry Flick from Billboard wrote, "If rave/NRG is your dance flavor of choice, "Rockin' For Myself' by Motiv8 is a must menu addition. Angie Brown, last heard fronting singles by Bizarre Inc., puts forth a respectable performance, while Steve Rodway crafts an instrumental picture that strobes with vibrant keyboard colors and racing beats. Paul Gotel steps in and gives the track a beefier bottom, while Stonebridge comes to the table with a recognizable disco-fried interpretation." Maria Jimenez from Music & Media stated, "Motiv8's happy, positivity track a la Urban Cookie Collective, Rockin' For Myself, is appealing in its warm Stonebridge Mix, the wide open Well Hung Parliament Adventure and the hi-pumpin' Ultimate Vocal Mix". Andy Beevers from Music Week rated it four out of five, calling it a "irrepressible house tune". James Hamilton from the magazine's RM Dance Update described it as a "Angie Brown chanted simple pop raver".

Track listing

 12", UK (1993)
"Rockin' for Myself" (Slammin' Granite Mix)
"Rockin' for Myself" (Instrumental Mix)
"Rockin' for Myself" (Dubrock Mix)
"Rockin' for Myself" (Granite Dub Mix)

 12", Germany (1994)
"Rockin' for Myself" (Ultimate Vocal Mix) – 5:38
"Rockin' for Myself" (Stonebridge Mix) – 7:18
"Rockin' for Myself" (Original Dubrock Mix) – 5:34
"Rockin' for Myself" (Paul Gotel Funked Out Mix) – 8:50

 CD single, UK (1993)
"Rockin' for Myself" (Radio Version) – 3:50
"Rockin' for Myself" (Slammin' Granite Mix) – 5:45
"Rockin' for Myself" (Dubrock Mix) – 5:35
"Rockin' for Myself" (Granite Instrumental) – 5:44
"Rockin' for Myself" (Granite Dub) – 5:44
"Rockin' for Myself" (Dubrock Instrumental) – 5:29

 CD single, UK & Europe (1994)
"Rockin' for Myself" (Radio Edit) – 3:51
"Rockin' for Myself" (Original Radio Edit) – 3:50
"Rockin' for Myself" (Ultimate Vocal Mix) – 5:38 
"Rockin' for Myself" (Paul Gotel Funked Out Mix) – 8:50
"Rockin' for Myself" (Happy Herbi Mix) – 5:35
"Rockin' for Myself" (Stonebridge Mix) – 7:16

Charts

Weekly charts

Year-end charts

Certification

References

 

1993 songs
1993 singles
1994 singles
Eurodance songs
Music Week number-one dance singles